The Tenor Giants Featuring Oscar Peterson is a 1975 live album by the tenor saxophonists Zoot Sims and Eddie "Lockjaw" Davis, featuring the pianist Oscar Peterson.

Reception

Bill Holland, writing for Billboard, said "[w]alk up to a friend who likes...jazz", listed the personnel, then said "get ready for a major smile", and mentioned that "Davis plays Coleman Hawkins to Sims' Lester Young".

Ken Dryden's AllMusic review says that the album "was an inspired idea, because each of the two tenor saxophonists approach the instrument differently...highly recommended." He calls the rhythm section "a great one...providing plenty of fuel for the featured soloists."

Track listing
 "The Man I Love" (George Gershwin, Ira Gershwin) – 10:42
 "My Old Flame" (Sam Coslow, Arthur Johnston) – 2:49
 "Don't Worry 'bout Me" (Rube Bloom, Ted Koehler) – 3:11
 "There Will Never Be Another You" (Mack Gordon, Harry Warren) – 8:17
 "I Don't Stand a Ghost of a Chance With You" (Bing Crosby, Ned Washington, Victor Young) – 5:32
 "Tangerine" (Johnny Mercer, Victor Schertzinger) – 9:03
 "Out of Nowhere" (Johnny Green, Edward Heyman) – 7:32
 "Groovin' High" (Dizzy Gillespie) – 10:24

Personnel

Performance
 Zoot Sims – tenor saxophone
 Eddie "Lockjaw" Davis - tenor saxophone
 Oscar Peterson – piano
 Niels-Henning Ørsted Pedersen – double bass
 Louie Bellson – drums

Production
 Norman Granz - producer
 Jamie Putnam - art direction
 Ted Williams - photography
 Deb Sibony - design

References

1975 live albums
Zoot Sims live albums
Eddie "Lockjaw" Davis live albums
Oscar Peterson live albums
Albums produced by Norman Granz
Pablo Records live albums